Stefan Voncken is a German coxswain.

Voncken is a member of the Ruderverein (rowing club) Neptun in Konstanz. He won gold with the coxed four at the 1969 European Rowing Championships in Klagenfurt. He won a gold medal at the 1970 World Rowing Championships in St. Catharines with the men's coxed four. After his competitive rowing career, he worked at his rowing club as a coach.

References

Year of birth missing (living people)
West German male rowers
World Rowing Championships medalists for West Germany
Coxswains (rowing)
Possibly living people
European Rowing Championships medalists